X-Flight is a steel roller coaster located at Six Flags Great America in Gurnee, Illinois. Designed and built by Bolliger & Mabillard, the ride opened as the fourth Wing Coaster in the world and the second in the United States on May 16, 2012. It replaced both the Splashwater Falls and Great American Raceway attractions. The  roller coaster features barrel rolls, high-speed drops, and a signature fly-through element, where the train narrowly misses a support structure – designed to look like an air traffic control tower – as it passes through an opening known as a keyhole element.

History
X-Flight was announced on September 1, 2011. Six Flags Great America was the first park to announce plans for a Wing Coaster in the United States. Land clearing started that same month on the former site of Splashwater Falls and the Great America Raceway. On January 27, 2012, the final piece of the lift hill was  topped off. The trains for X-Flight arrived at the park on March 2, 2012. In a Chicago Sun-Times article in February, the park said they expect safety tests to start in early April. A soft opening media preview event was held on May 10, 2012. X-Flight opened for "Xclusive season pass holders" on the weekend of May 12 and then to the public on May 16, 2012.

Ride experience

After departing from the station, which resembles an airplane hangar, the train immediately begins to climb the steep  chain lift hill. Upon reaching the top of the lift hill, the train enters the first element of the roller coaster, a Dive Drop. This element is similar to the Dive Drop's found on The Swarm at Thorpe Park and GateKeeper at Cedar Point and consists of the train rotating 180 degrees into an upside down position before descending back to the ground. At the bottom of the first drop, riders get their picture taken. After the train exits the first drop, the train then enters a zero-g-roll before going through a cloud of fog. The train then makes a slight left turn before entering an Immelmann loop followed by a right turn over a pond. The train then leads into the second zero-g-roll over the main entrance of the ride. Following the roll, the train makes a left turn before going through an Inline twist. During this element, which is known as a keyhole, riders go through an actual airplane control tower (which was retrieved from O'Hare International Airport), giving the illusion the train will hit the tower. After going through the tower, the train goes through another near miss keyhole surrounded by a cloud of fog, before exiting the twist and making a tight right turn, passing by Demon's corkscrews and last turn, before making a slight left upward turn leading into the Main Brake. The train then makes a 180-degree left turn into the Slowdown Brake and the Transfer Track before entering the station. One cycle lasts about 1 minute and 15 seconds.

Characteristics

Manufacturer
X-Flight is a Wing Coaster model from Swiss manufacturer, Bolliger & Mabillard. It was the fifth B&M coaster for Six Flags Great America. X Flight joins the inverted roller coaster, Batman: The Ride, the hyper-twister, Raging Bull and the flying roller coaster, Superman: Ultimate Flight, giving the park a total of four operating coasters from B&M. The park's first B&M coaster, Iron Wolf, was moved to Six Flags America at the end of the 2011 season. X-Flight was the fourth Wing Coaster built and the second in the United States, preceded by Wild Eagle at Dollywood.

Trains
X-Flight operates with two steel and fiberglass trains. Each train has eight cars with four seats per car (two on each side of the track) for a total of 32 riders per train. The colors of the train are red and black with over-the-shoulder restraints. The restraints are similar to the restraints found on Superman: Ultimate Flight.

Track
The track is colored red while the supports are black.

Reception
X-Flight has received mostly positive reviews. Doug George from the Chicago Tribune stated the ride is very smooth with "rolls, dives and inverted, eye-bugging flips." However, he stated that the ride is pretty short and with only one train running the course at a time, the wait time can reach as long as other popular attractions at the park. "The Coaster Critic" reviewed the ride and stated that the theming is very well done, especially the keyhole element. He said the different seating set up encourages re-rides because of the different experience on each side of the train. Overall, he gave the ride a 9 out of 10 because of the "riding position, loops, and interactions or near-misses."

Awards

See also
 2012 in amusement parks
 Wild Eagle, a Bolliger & Mabillard Wing Coaster at Dollywood, was the first of its kind in the United States
 GateKeeper, a Bolliger & Mabillard Wing Coaster at Cedar Point

References

External links

 

Six Flags Great America
Roller coasters operated by Six Flags
Roller coasters in Illinois